Zimbalist (originally Tsimbalist) is a surname that means "one who plays the cimbalom (traditional string instrument of Central and East Europe)" and can refer to:

 Al Zimbalist (1910–1975), producer of low-budget films such as Cat Women of the Moon, Watusi, and Baby Face Nelson
 Andrew Zimbalist (born 1947), American economist, father of Jeff and Michael
 Efrem Zimbalist (1889–1985), Russian violinist, father of Efrem Jr.
 Efrem Zimbalist Jr. (1918–2014), American actor, son of Efrem and father of Stephanie
 Jeffrey "Jeff" (Leib Nettler) Zimbalist (born 1978), American documentary filmmaker, son of Andrew
 Michael Zimbalist (born 1980), American filmmaker, son of Andrew
 Mary Louise Curtis Bok Zimbalist (1876–1970), founder of the Curtis Institute of Music, married to Efrem
 Michelle Zimbalist Rosaldo (1944–1981), American anthropologist
 Sam Zimbalist (1901–1958), American Oscar-winning film producer
 Stephanie Zimbalist (born 1956), American actress, daughter of Efrem Jr.

Jewish families
Jewish surnames
Occupational surnames